Syarhey Shchehrykovich (Sergey Shchegrikovich; born 19 December 1990) is a Belarusian professional football player.

His cousin Dzmitry Shchagrykovich is also a professional footballer.

Honours
Minsk
Belarusian Cup winner: 2012–13

References

External links

1990 births
Living people
Belarusian footballers
Association football midfielders
FC Partizan Minsk players
FC Dynamo Brest players
FC Minsk players
FC Smolevichi players
FC Slavia Mozyr players
FC Krumkachy Minsk players
FC Slutsk players
FC Rukh Brest players
FC Ostrovets players